Broken Chains may refer to:

 Broken Chains (album), an album by Malcolm Wild
 Broken Chains (film), a 1922 film directed by Allen Holubar